Nugget may refer to:

Places
 Nugget Falls (Oregon), an alternate name for Dillon Falls in Southern Oregon
 Nugget Falls, a waterfall in Alaska
 Nugget Point, New Zealand

People
 H. C. Coombs (1906–1997), Australian economist and public servant, nicknamed Nugget
 Steve Davis (born 1957), snooker player, nicknamed Nugget
 Owen Hart (1965–1999), Canadian professional wrestler, derisively nicknamed Nugget

Aircraft
 Bede BD-17 Nugget, a single-seat homebuilt monoplane
 Laister LP-15 Nugget, a single-seat glider aircraft

Arts, entertainment, and media
 "Nugget", a song by Cake from the 1996 the album Fashion Nugget
 North Bay Nugget, a daily newspaper in North Bay, Ontario, Canada
 Nugget Newspaper, a weekly newspaper in Sisters, Oregon
 The Nome Nugget, a weekly newspaper in Nome, Alaska
 The Nugget, a 2002 comedy film
 Weekly Nugget was Tombstone, Arizona's first newspaper (1879 to 1882), founded by Artemus Fay (?-1906). Harry Wood (1848-896) was a writer for the Weekly Nugget and an under-sheriff of Johnny Behan, leader of the Ten Percent Ring.
"Nugget" a fictional character from the Kindergarten video game series

Foods and beverages
 Nugget, a variety of hops
 Chicken nugget, a lump of breaded or battered chicken

Businesses
 Carson Nugget, a hotel and casino in Carson City, Nevada
 Nugget Casino Resort, a hotel and casino in Sparks, Nevada
 Nugget Markets, an upscale California supermarket chain
 Wendover Nugget, a hotel and casino in West Wendover, Nevada

Other uses
 Denver Nuggets, an NBA basketball team from Denver, Colorado, United States
 Gold nugget, a piece of gold produced through mining and extraction
 Nugget, a property of the variogram in statistics

See also
 Golden Nugget (disambiguation)
 Nougat, a variety of similar traditional confectioneries
 Nuggets (disambiguation)
 Nugget (coin)
 Nugget Creek
 NuGet (software)